{{Infobox pro wrestling championship
|image=
|caption=
|championshipname=ECWA Unified Heavyweight Championship
|currentholder= Travis Lee
|won= November 5, 2022
|promotion=East Coast Wrestling Association 
|created=August 1967
|mostreigns=Cheetah Master and Joey Ace (3 times)
|firstchamp=Lance Diamond
|longestreign=Lance Diamond (853 days)
|shortestreign=Xavier (<1 day)
|oldest=
|youngest=
|heaviest=
|lightest=
|pastnames=* ECWA Heavyweight Championship(1993–2012)
ECWA Unified Heavyweight Championship(2012–present)
|}}ECWA Heavyweight Championship' is the top title contested in the independent professional wrestling promotion East Coast Wrestling Association. The current champion is Travis Lee, who is in his first reign.

History
ECWA began as a backyard wrestling promotion in New Castle, DE started by Jim Kettner and a close friend of Kettner's at his home in 1967.
In the early 1980s, the promotion ran under the banner of East Coast Wrestling Semi-Pro wrestling. Spot shows ran throughout New Castle County, Delaware during the 1980s. Shows were performed at venues such as Millcreek Fire Hall, Corpus Christi School, Thomas McKean High School, Claymont Fire Hall, Nur Temple, St. Matthews Parish Center, The Wilmington Boys and Girls Club, as well as various other "one time" stops.

Title history prior to 1993 was not recorded, however the first champion was Red Devil in 1967, confirmed by Jim Kettner.

Reigns

 Combined reigns 

References

Duncan, Royal and Gary Will. Wrestling Title Histories, Revised 4th Edition''. Waterloo, Ontario: Archeus Communications, 2000. 
http://www.cagematch.net/?id=5&nr=27

External links
solie.org - ECWA Heavyweight Championship title history
 ECWA Heavyweight Championship

East Coast Wrestling Association championships
Heavyweight wrestling championships
Regional professional wrestling championships